Jerzy Sołtan (March 6, 1913 - September 16, 2005) was a Polish architect who worked with Le Corbusier and was the Robinson Jr., Professor of Architecture and Urban Design at Harvard Graduate School of Design, where he taught from 1959 until his retirement in 1979.  In addition, "between 1968 and 1970 he worked in partnership with Albert Szabo  (Sołtan and Szabo)...with whom he designed several houses in New Hampshire and Massachusetts."

His teaching was first recognized by the Association of Collegiate Schools of Architecture when he received the ACSA Distinguished Professor Award in 1986–87.  The American Institute of Architects and the Association of Collegiate Schools of Architecture jointly awarded Soltan the Topaz Medallion for Excellence in Architectural Education in 2002.

References

External links

2005 deaths
20th-century Polish architects
1913 births
Harvard Graduate School of Design faculty
Polish emigrants to the United States
Jerzy